O with diaeresis (Ӧ ӧ; italics: Ӧ ӧ) is a letter of the Cyrillic script. 
In all its forms it looks exactly like the Latin letter Ö (Ö ö Ö ö).

O with diaeresis is used in the alphabets of the Altay, Khakas, Komi, Kurdish, Mari, Shor and Udmurt  languages.

Usage
 
In Altai, Khakas and Shor, it represents the close-mid front rounded vowel .

In Komi, it represents the schwa .

In Kurdish, it represents the close back rounded vowel .

In Mari, it represents the open-mid front rounded vowel  .

In Udmurt, it represents the open-mid back unrounded vowel .

In Russian books until the beginning of the 20th century, the letter Ӧ has been sporadically used instead of Ё in foreign names and loanwords (for example, the city of Cologne, Germany, which is Köln in German, might have been rendered in Russian as "Кӧльн").

In Tatar, this letter appeared in the 1861 Cyrillic orthography by Nikolay Ilminsky. This letter was replaced by Ө in 1939.

Computing codes

See also
Ö ö : Latin letter O with diaeresis - an Azerbaijani, Estonian, Finnish, German, Hungarian, Icelandic, Swedish, Turkish, and Turkmen letter.
Ơ ơ : Latin letter O with horn, used in Vietnamese language
Ø ø : Latin letter O with stroke
Õ õ : Latin letter O with tilde, used in Estonian language
Œ œ : Ligature Oe
О о : Cyrillic letter O
Ө ө : Cyrillic letter Oe
Ӫ ӫ : Cyrillic letter Oe with diaeresis
Cyrillic characters in Unicode

Cyrillic letters with diacritics
Letters with diaeresis